McCarthy House may refer to:

United States
(by state then city)
Judge Charles P. McCarthy House, Boise, Idaho, listed on the National Register of Historic Places (NRHP) in Ada County
Patrick F. McCarthy House, Davenport, Iowa, NRHP-listed in Scott County
John McCarthy House, Edgerton, Kansas, listed on the NRHP in Johnson County
Margaret McCarthy Homestead, Big Prairie, Montana, listed on the NRHP in Flathead County
McCarthy Homestead Cabin, in Glacier National Park near West Glacier, Montana, NRHP-listed
McCarthy-Platt House, Reno, Nevada, listed on the NRHP in Washoe County
McCarthy House (Virginia City, Nevada), NRHP-listed in Storey County
Timothy C. and Katherine McCarthy House, Madison, Wisconsin, listed on the NRHP in Dane County

See also
McCarthy Building (disambiguation)